Three Monks, also translated as The Three Buddhist Priests, is a Chinese animated short film produced by the Shanghai Animation Film Studio (SAFS). After the end of the Cultural Revolution in 1976, the film was one of the first animations created as part of the rebirth period. It won the Silver Bear for Best Short Film at the 32nd Berlin International Film Festival.

Plot
A young monk lives a simple life on a hilltop Buddhist temple. He has one daily task of hauling two buckets of water up the hill using a carrying pole. One day, a skinny monk arrives. The young monk tries to share the job with the skinny monk, but the carry pole is only long enough for one bucket. They therefore decide to carry one bucket in the center of the pole, together. However, when they go up and down hill, the bucket shifts from one end to another. The weight ends up unevenly distributed, and the two monks end up in an argument. The problem is settled when the two monks measure the exact center of the pole and keep the bucket in position. A few days later, a fat monk joins them. The fat monk drinks all the water upon his arrival, and is told to fetch more water by himself. The fat monk brings up more water, but once again drinks it all. At this point, everyone expects the others to take on the chore, and consequently, no one fetches water despite their thirst. One night, a scrounging rat knocks over a candleholder, leading to a devastating fire in the temple. The three desperate monks finally unite and mount a concerted effort to put out the fire. By the end of the ordeal, they recognize the importance of unity and begin to live a harmonious life. The three monks create a pulley system to fetch water, allowing the three to work together with ease, and ensuring the temple never lacks water again.

Production
SAFS Director A Da first came up with the idea for Three Monks in 1978 after overhearing a conversation at a party which involved the ancient Chinese proverb, "One monk will shoulder two buckets of water, two monks will share the load, but add a third and no one will want to fetch water." He was reminded that this phenomenon continued to be prevalent in modern times, and would be an interesting subject matter for animation. A Da relayed his ideas to screenwriter Bao Lei, who came up with a script had no dialogue, but was humorous and emphasized the character's actions.

The film does not contain any dialogue, allowing it to be watched by any culture, and a different music instrument was used to signify each monk. The film tells the story from the aspect of the buddhist bhikkhu.

Crew
 Director: Xu Jingda (A Da)
 Screenwriter: Bao Lei
 Cinematography: You Yong
 Animation: Han Yu, Ma Kexuan, Fan Madi

Awards
 Won the outstanding film award at China's Ministry of Culture.
 Won the Best animated film prize at the first Golden Rooster Awards in 1981.
 Won four international awards including a Silver Bear for Short Film at the 32nd Berlin Film Festival in 1982.

References

External links
 Three Monks at China's Movie Database

1981 films
Chinese animated films
Animated films without speech
Films about Buddhism
1981 animated films
Chinese short films
Chinese animated short films
Buddhist animation